Ashland Covered Bridge, also known as Ashland Bridge or Barley Mill Road Covered Bridge, is a covered bridge over Red Clay Creek on Barley Mill Road (near the junction of Brackenville Road) in Ashland in New Castle County, Delaware. It was added to the National Register of Historic Places in 1973.

Style 
It is a Town lattice truss bridge following a design of Ithiel Town, built about 1860. It is almost identical to the Wooddale Bridge.

History 

In 1965, when it was documented in the Historic American Engineering Record survey, it was one of the last three surviving covered bridges in the state of Delaware.

The bridge has been closed for repairs several times in the 2010s. In 2014 and 2011, oversized trucks caused damage to the bridge after ignoring signage and attempting to cross, and in 2017 a snow plow crash caused additional damage. In 2021, it was closed for temporary repairs after debris and high creek levels due to Hurricane Ida caused damage to the covered portion of the span.

See also 
List of covered bridges in the United States

References

External links

Road bridges on the National Register of Historic Places in Delaware
Bridges in New Castle County, Delaware
Bridges completed in 1860
Covered bridges in Delaware
Historic American Buildings Survey in Delaware
National Register of Historic Places in New Castle County, Delaware
Covered bridges on the National Register of Historic Places in Delaware
Wooden bridges in Delaware
Lattice truss bridges in the United States